Vestby Avis (The Vestby Gazette) is a local Norwegian newspaper published in the municipality of Vestby in Akershus county. 

The paper is published weekly by Amedia. It was launched on May 26, 2006, and at the same time the company also started publishing Ås Avis in the neighboring municipality of Ås. Initially it was published only once a month and was distributed free to all households in the municipality. The manager of both of these newspapers, as well as Enebakk Avis, is Anne E. Lunde. Vestby Avis is edited by Mattias Mellquist. The paper's editorial material is produced locally, but it shares its advertising with Akershus Amtstidende and Smaalenenes Avis.

Circulation
According to the Norwegian Audit Bureau of Circulations and National Association of Local Newspapers, Vestby Avis has had the following annual circulation:

References

External links
Vestby Avis homepage

Newspapers published in Norway
Norwegian-language newspapers
Vestby
Mass media in Akershus
Publications established in 2006
2006 establishments in Norway